The Liechtenstein women's national football team is the national women's football team of the Principality of Liechtenstein and is controlled by the Liechtenstein Football Association. The organisation is known as the Liechtensteiner Fussballverband in German. The team's first match was an unofficial friendly against FFC Vorderland in Triesen, Liechtenstein, a 2–3 defeat in June 2019. Their first official match was on 11 April 2021, a 2–1 defeat against Luxembourg.

History
Liechtenstein did not have a women's national team by 2006 at either the senior or youth level. In 2013, President of the Liechtenstein Football Association (LIV) Matthias Voigt said he was committed towards working on the creation of a women's national team, and pointed to the activity level in the women's domestic competition. Despite this comment, the federation had no staff dedicated to women's football as of 2017 and also did not have a women's football committee. Inclusion of women in governance was also limited, with only one woman serving on a committee and only five women serving in managerial positions within the organization. Progress on the development front as a result of activities by the LFV were part of the reason that Radio Liechtenstein cited in September 2017 the time to create a senior women's national team.

Liechtenstein's U16 and U18 girls' national teams had already been in existence by 2017.  UEFA listed the senior national women's side as a U19 B team.

On 11 April 2021, the team played their first official match, a 2–1 defeat against Luxembourg. Liechtenstein took the lead in the 35th minute with a goal by Viktoria Gerner, the first official goal in the team's history.

Team image

Nicknames
The Liechtenstein women's national football team has been known or nicknamed as "The Blues-Reds".

Home stadium

Liechtenstein play its home matches on the Freizeitpark Widau.

Results and fixtures

The following is a list of match results in the last 12 months, as well as any future matches that have been scheduled.

Legend

2022

Official Liechtenstein Results and Fixtures
Liechtenstein Results and Fixtures – Soccerway.com

All-time record

Key

FIFA official "A" matches only

Coaching staff

Current coaching staff

Manager history
 Philipp Riedener (2020–)

Players

Current squad
 The following players were called up for the friendlies against  on 6 and 9 October 2022.
 Caps and goals are current as of 9 October 2022 after the match against .

Recent call-ups
 The following players were called up in the last 12 months.Notes: = Preliminary squad
 = Injured

Captains
Viktoria Gerner (2021–)

Records
Source: LFV StatisticsPlayers in bold are still active and available for selection.''

Most capped players

Top goalscorers

Competitive record

FIFA Women's World Cup

UEFA Women's Championship

See also

Sport in Liechtenstein
Football in Liechtenstein
Women's football in Liechtenstein
Liechtenstein women's national under-21 football team
Liechtenstein women's national under-17 football team
Liechtenstein men's national football team

References

External links
Liechtenstein women's national football team – official website 
FIFA profile

European women's national association football teams
national football team
Liechtenstein women's national football team